NGC 241 is an open cluster located in the constellation Tucana. It is located within the Small Magellanic Cloud. It was discovered on April 11, 1834 by John Herschel.

References

0241
Open clusters
Tucana (constellation)
Small Magellanic Cloud